K. Chacko Joseph is a senior Indian politician and long term member of the Indian National Congress. He was the former Minister for Rural Development, Planning & Culture of the Government of Kerala from the year 2011 to 2016. He represented the Irikkur constituency in Kerala eight times from 1982 to 2021.

Portfolio 

Rural Development, Planning and Economic Affairs, Culture, Dairy Development, Milk Co-operatives, Non-Resident Keralites Affairs & Information and Public Relations.

Son of Shri.K.M.Chacko and Smt. Thresiamma Chacko; born at Poovam near Changanassery on 3 June 1946; M.A., LLB; Advocate; social and Political Worker.

Entered Politics through All Kerala Balajana Sakhyam and KSU. Was General Secretary of All Kerala Balajana Sakhyam; President, KSU Kottayam District Committee; Vice President, KSU State Committee; Secretary, Kerala University Union; General Secretary, National Council of National Students Union of India; Was President Kerala Pradesh Youth Congress; Was Member, Kerala University Syndicate, Executive Committee of Kerala Agricultural University; Convener, Standing Committee of Syndicate on Finance; Managing Editor, "Socialist Youth" Weekly. He was the President of District Congress Committee, Kottayam. 

Also served as Member, AICC; Secretary, Congress Legislature Party; Chairman, Committee on Privileges and Ethics; Committee on Private Members Bills and Resolutions.  Previously elected to K.L.A. in 1982, 1987, 1991, 1996, 2001, 2006, 2011 and 2016.

He was elected from Irikkur Constituency to the Kerala Legislative Assembly representing Indian National Congress continuously from 1982 to 2021.

 Government of Kerala
 Kerala Ministers
One of the representatives of Malabar Migrants.

References

State cabinet ministers of Kerala
Living people
1946 births
People from Kannur district
Indian National Congress politicians from Kerala
Kerala MLAs 1982–1987
Kerala MLAs 1987–1991
Kerala MLAs 1991–1996
Kerala MLAs 1996–2001
Kerala MLAs 2001–2006
Kerala MLAs 2006–2011
Kerala MLAs 2011–2016
Kerala MLAs 2016–2021